The Kampala–Gayaza Road is a road in the Central Region of Uganda, connecting the capital city of Kampala to the town of Gayaza in the Wakiso District. The road is part of the  Kampala–Gayaza–Ziroobwe Road Project.

Location
The road starts at the roundabout on the Kampala-Bombo Road,  from downtown Kampala. It continues through the Kaleerwe neighborhood, where it crosses the Kampala Northern Bypass Highway.

Overview
The improvement to class II bitumen standard with shoulders, drainage channels, and culverts was commissioned in 2008.

Points of interest
The following additional points of interest lie along or near the road:

1.

2.

3.

4.

5.

6.

See also
 List of roads in Uganda

References

External links
Website of Uganda National Roads Authority

Roads in Uganda
Wakiso District
Transport in Kampala